Charles Booth (birth unknown – death unknown) was an English professional rugby league footballer who played in the 1930s and 1940s.

Playing career

International honours
Charlie Booth represented British Empire while at Hull in 1937 against France, and won caps for England while at Hull in 1938 against Wales (2 matches), and in 1939 against Wales.

County Cup Final appearances
Charlie Booth played left-, i.e. number 11, in Hull FC's 10-18 defeat by Huddersfield in the 1938–39 Yorkshire County Cup Final during the 1938–39 season at Odsal Stadium, Bradford on Saturday 22 October 1938.

References

External links
 (archived by web.archive.org) Stats → PastPlayers → B at hullfc.com

British Empire rugby league team players
England national rugby league team players
English rugby league players
Hull F.C. captains
Hull F.C. players
Oldham R.L.F.C. players
Place of birth missing
Place of death missing
Rugby league hookers
Rugby league second-rows
Year of birth missing
Year of death missing